Pacola is a town in Panama. It is located in the Panamá Province.

Populated places in Panamá Province